Chełm Dolny is a village in the administrative district of Gmina Trzcińsko-Zdrój, within Gryfino County, West Pomeranian Voivodeship, in north-western Poland.

For the history of the region, see History of Pomerania.

Henning von Tresckow grew up in Wartenberg and was buried at the local cemetery, which was destroyed after World War II.

References

Villages in Gryfino County